Saxonipollis saxonicus is an extinct plant species. It was possibly carnivorous. It is known only from fossilised pollen found in Eocene deposits of East Germany.

Saxonipollis saxonicus was possibly a precursor to Aldrovanda, or a close relative to its precursor.

References

Droseraceae
Extinct carnivorous plants
Prehistoric angiosperm genera
Eocene plants
Fossil taxa described in 1970